An election to Waterford City and County Council took place on 23 May 2014 as part of that year's Irish local elections. 32 councillors were elected from five local electoral areas by on the system of proportional representation by means of the single transferable vote (PR-STV) for a five-year term of office. This was a new local authority formed by a merger from the abolished Waterford City Council and Waterford County Councils. In addition, the town councils of Dungarvan, Lismore and Tramore were also abolished.

Although it was behind Fine Gael in terms of first preference vote share, Fianna Fáil emerged as the joint largest party on the council after the elections winning 8 seats in all. The party secured 3 seats in Comeragh, 2 in Dungarvan-Lismore and 1 in each of the Waterford city LEAs where the party had been traditionally weak after 2004 and 2009. Fine Gael's best result was in Dungarvan-Lismore where the party returned 3 seats. As the results indicate several of the party's sitting councillors lost their seats across the City and County. It was also a very poor election for Labour who were reduced to just 1 seat on the new Council and no City representation. The Workers' Party lost its sole seat; the first time since 1974 where it had no representation in Waterford local politics. Sinn Féin had a very successful election increasing their numbers to 6 across the City and County and winning a seat in each LEA. Independents secured the remaining 9 seats.

Results by party

Results by Electoral Area

Comeragh

Dungarvan-Lismore

Tramore-Waterford City West

Waterford City East

Waterford City South

References

Changes since 2014
† Waterford City East Cllr Eddie Mulligan joined Fianna Fáil and ceased to be an Independent on 2 November 2014. 
†† Comeragh Fianna Fáil Cllr Mary Butler was elected a TD for Waterford at the Irish general election, 2016. Ray Murphy was co-opted to fill the vacancy.
††† Waterford City East Fine Gael Cllr John Carey died on 8 September 2018 after a short illness. His daughter, Sharon, was co-opted to fill the vacancy on 8 November 2018.
†††† Waterford City East Independent Cllr Mary Roche resigned her seat on 30 November 2018 for personal reasons. Matt Shanahan was co-opted to fill the vacancy.

External links
 Official website

2014 Irish local elections
2014